Farah Naqvi is an Indian writer, consultant and activist. A post-graduate from Columbia University, she works on gender and minority rights from both a justice and development perspective. She was a member of the National Advisory Council. She is a founding member of Nirantar, an NGO working in the field of gender and education; credited with founding the newspaper Khabar Lahariya. She has been a board member at Oxfam India. Farah has also worked in the field of Broadcast Journalism. She co-directed the film The Colour of My Home (2018).

Works 
Waves In The Hinterland: The Journey of A Newspaper (2007) published by Zubaan Books | 

Working with Muslims: Beyond Burqa and Triple Talaq (2017) published by Three Essays Collective |

References

Living people
Social workers
Members of National Advisory Council, India
Indian social sciences writers
Year of birth missing (living people)
Columbia University alumni
English-language writers from India
Indian women activists
Writers from Delhi